Senegal made its Paralympic Games début at the 2004 Summer Paralympics in Athens. The country sent just two athletes (one man and one woman) to compete in track and field. It returned in 2008, with the same combination.

Senegal has never taken part in the Winter Paralympics, and no Senegalese athlete has ever won a Paralympic medal.

Senegal will be taking part in the 2012 Summer Paralympics, and the Comité National Provisoire Handisport et Paralympique Sénégalais have chosen Bedford as the UK training base for its Paralympians.

Full results for Senegal at the Paralympics

See also
 Senegal at the Olympics

References